Xozavi (also, Khazovi and Khozavi) is a village in the Lerik Rayon of Azerbaijan.  The village forms part of the municipality of Nisli.

References 

Populated places in Lerik District